Moran Assembly constituency is one of the 126 assembly constituencies of  Assam, India.

Members of Legislative Assembly
 1951: Ghana Kanta Gogoi, Independent
 1957: Padma Kumari Gohain, Indian National Congress
 1962: Padma Kumari Gohain, Indian National Congress
 1967: Padma Kumari Gohain, Indian National Congress
 1972: Tarun Chandra Chutia, Indian National Congress
 1978: Joy Chandra Nagbanshi, Indian National Congress (I)
 1983: Joy Chandra Nagbanshi, Indian National Congress
 1985: Kiron Kumar Gogoi, Independent
 1991: Joy Chandra Nagbanshi, Indian National Congress
 1996: Joy Chandra Nagbanshi, Indian National Congress
 2001: Sarbananda Sonowal, Asom Gana Parishad
 2004: Jibantara Ghatowar, Indian National Congress
 2006: Jibantara Ghatowar, Indian National Congress
 2011: Jibantara Ghatowar, Indian National Congress
 2016: Chakradhar Gogoi, Bharatiya Janata Party
 2021: Chakradhar Gogoi, Bharatiya Janata Party

Election results

2016 results

2011 results

2006 results

See also
 Dibrugarh
 List of constituencies of Assam Legislative Assembly

References

External links 
 

Assembly constituencies of Assam
Dibrugarh district